In Country is a 1992 compilation album from Swedish pop and country singer Kikki Danielsson.

Track listing
"Listen to a Country Song"
"Talking in Your Sleep"
"Walk on By"
"Stand by Your Man"
"Sweet Little You"
Nine to Five (9 to 5)
"U.S. of America"
"Cowboy Yodel Song"
"Diggy Diggy Lo"
"Good Year for the Roses"
Good Year for the Roses
Stagger Lee
Texas when I Die
Take Me to the Pilot
"Nashville, Tennessee"

Contributing musicians
vocals, Kikki Danielsson
Kjell Öhman, piano
Rutger Gunnarsson, bass
Roger Palm, Ola Brunkert, drums
Hasse Rosén, guitar, dobro

References

1992 compilation albums
Kikki Danielsson compilation albums